This is a list of butterflies of Mauritius. About thirty-nine species are known from the islands of Mauritius and Rodrigues, seven of which are endemic.

Papilionidae

Papilioninae

Papilionini
Papilio demodocus Esper, [1798]
Papilio manlius Fabricius, 1798

Pieridae

Coliadinae
Eurema brigitta pulchella (Boisduval, 1833)
Eurema floricola ceres (Butler, 1886)
Catopsilia florella thauruma (Reakirt, 1866)

Lycaenidae

Theclinae

Theclini
Deudorix antalus (Hopffer, 1855)

Polyommatinae

Polyommatini
Pseudonacaduba sichela reticulum (Mabille, 1877)
Cacyreus darius (Mabille, 1877)
Zizeeria knysna (Trimen, 1862)
Zizina antanossa (Mabille, 1877)
Zizula hylax (Fabricius, 1775)
Lampides boeticus (Linnaeus, 1767)
Leptotes mandersi (Druce, 1907)
Leptotes pirithous (Linnaeus, 1767)

Nymphalidae

Libytheinae
Libythea cinyras Trimen, 1866

Danainae

Danaini
Danaus plexippus (Linnaeus, 1758)
Amauris phoedon (Fabricius, 1798)
Euploea desjardinsii (Guérin-Méneville, 1844)
Euploea euphon (Fabricius, 1798)

Satyrinae

Satyrini
Heteropsis narcissus (Fabricius, 1798)

Melanitini
Melanitis leda (Linnaeus, 1758)

Nymphalinae

Nymphalini
Antanartia borbonica mauritiana Manders, 1908
Vanessa cardui (Linnaeus, 1758)
Junonia goudotii (Boisduval, 1833)
Junonia rhadama (Boisduval, 1833)
Salamis augustina vinsoni Le Cerf, 1922
Hypolimnas anthedon drucei (Butler, 1874)
Hypolimnas bolina jacintha (Drury, [1773])
Hypolimnas misippus (Linnaeus, 1764)

Limenitinae

Neptidini
Neptis frobenia (Fabricius, 1798)

Heliconiinae

Vagrantini
Phalanta phalantha aethiopica (Rothschild & Jordan, 1903)

Hesperiidae

Coeliadinae
Coeliades ernesti (Grandidier, 1867)
Coeliades forestan (Stoll, [1782])

Pyrginae

Tagiadini
Eagris sabadius (Gray, 1832)

Hesperiinae

Aeromachini
Erionota thrax (Linnaeus, 1767)

Baorini
Borbo borbonica (Boisduval, 1833)
Parnara naso (Fabricius, 1798)

See also
List of moths of Mauritius
Wildlife of Mauritius

References

Mauritius
Mauritius
Butterflies